The Hoboken Cemetery is located at 5500 Tonnelle Avenue in North Bergen, New Jersey, United States. in the New Durham section. It was owned by the City of Hoboken. The Flower Hill Cemetery borders it on two sides. Although one may have the sense of a well groomed and cared for cemetery when first arriving at the Hoboken Cemetery, just a short walk in any direction and you will find a different story.  It is bordered by Flower Hill Cemetery. The Secaucus Junction was built on land that was partially the Hudson County Burial Grounds. The exhumed bodies were to be re-interred at the Hoboken Cemetery but that was cancelled when the cemetery was found to have been recycling older full graves that did not have tombstones, and selling them as virgin plots. The cemetery said it has no record of any bodies being buried in those plots.

Notable burials
 Oscar Louis Auf der Heide (1874–1945), mayor of West New York, New Jersey.
 Allan Langdon McDermott (1854–1908), US Congressman.
 Henry Otto Wittpenn (1871–1931), mayor of Jersey City, New Jersey.
 Edwin Ruthvin Vincent Wright (1812–1871), represented New Jersey's 5th congressional district from 1865–1867.

See also
 Machpelah Cemetery
 List of cemeteries in Hudson County, New Jersey

References

External links 
 Hoboken Cemetery at Graveinfo
 Hoboken Cemetery by Rob Bender
 Hoboken Cemetery at The Political Graveyard
 
 Civil War gravestones in Hudson County

North Bergen, New Jersey
Cemeteries in Hudson County, New Jersey
Buildings and structures in Hoboken, New Jersey
Funeral scandals